The 2005–06 Scottish Second Division was won by Gretna who were promoted to the First Division in what was their second successive promotion. Partick Thistle were also promoted via the playoffs. Dumbarton were relegated while Alloa Athletic retained their Second Division status by beating Arbroath and Berwick Rangers in the playoff matches.

Table

Top scorers

Attendances
The average attendances for Division Two clubs for season 2005/06 are shown below:

Second Division play-offs
The Playoff semi-finals took on 3 May 2006 and 6 May 2006. The final took place on 10 May 2006 and 14 May 2006.

Semi-finals
Arbroath 1–1 Alloa Athletic
Alloa Athletic 1–0 Arbroath
Stenhousemuir 0–1 Berwick Rangers
Berwick Rangers 0–0 Stenhousemuir

Final
Alloa Athletic 4–0 Berwick Rangers
Berwick Rangers 2–1 Alloa Athletic

Scottish Second Division seasons
2
3
Scot